was a joint venture partnership between the Japanese photographic firm Fujifilm Holdings and the American document management company Xerox to develop, produce and sell xerographic and document-related products and services in the Asia-Pacific region. Its headquarters was in Midtown West in Akasaka, Minato, Tokyo. Fuji Xerox was the world's longest running joint venture between a Japanese and an American company.

History
Fuji Xerox was established in 1962 as a 50:50 partnership with Rank Xerox.  Rank Xerox was absorbed into Xerox Corporation in 1997.

Originally only a distributor of Rank Xerox products, Fuji Xerox later began to research and develop its own xerographic machines and other devices, beginning with the FX2200 photocopier in 1973. This machine was considered the world's smallest copier. The company was also responsible for the innovation and manufacture of many of the colour printing devices sold by Xerox Corporation.  Its innovations include the world's first multifunction printer/copier, the "Xero Printer 100", launched in 1987.

Fuji Xerox expanded into Australia, New Zealand, Singapore and Malaysia in 1982 by purchasing distribution rights from Xerox Corporation, it established a subsidiary company Fuji Xerox Asia Pacific Pte headquartered in Singapore. Fuji Xerox Australia Pty Ltd was Australia's No.1 Document Printing and Copying company in the country. It was also the highest performing Fuji Xerox subsidiary in Asia. Its first dealership was NQBE in Mackay, North Queensland.

Xerox Corporation transferred its China/Hong Kong operations to Fuji Xerox in 2000 and Fuji Photo Film Co. raised its stake in the venture to 75% in 2001.

As of March 2009, the company employed 40,646 people (Consolidated).

On January 31, 2018, Xerox announced that Fujifilm had agreed to acquire a 50.1% controlling stake in the company for US$6.1 billion, which would be combined into Fuji Xerox, creating a company with a total market value of US$18 billion. However, the deal was called off in May 2018 following resistance by Xerox's board.

On November 5, 2019, Fujifilm had announced that they would acquire the remaining 25% stake of Fuji Xerox from Xerox for a total of $2.3 Billion.

On January 6, 2020, Fujifilm announced that it would not renew its technology agreement with Xerox when it expires at the end of March 2021, and that Fuji Xerox would be renamed Fujifilm Business Innovation Corporation in April 2021. Fujifilm stated that unwinding the venture would allow them to "utilise our own technologies and synergise with technologies owned by other Fujifilm Group companies to produce/market products and solutions under our own new brand worldwide". The company will maintain its product supply agreements with Xerox.

Headquarters

The headquarters of Fuji Xerox was located in Midtown West in Tokyo Midtown, Akasaka, Minato, Tokyo. The headquarters of Fuji Xerox moved to its final location on January 15, 2007.

See also

 Xerox
 Fujifilm
 Rank Xerox
 Xerox India
 FXPAL
 Fujifilm Super Cup
 Fuji Xerox Towers

References

External links

 Fuji Xerox Company, Limited 
 Fuji Xerox Overseas Network 
 Fuji Xerox Australia 
Fuji Xerox Online Support
Switched on to green power
Ex-Doyukai Chairman Kobayashi dies The Yomiuri Shimbun, 9 September 2015
  Wiki collection of bibliographic works on Fuji Xerox

 
Xerox
Xerox
Electronics companies of Japan
Multinational joint-venture companies
Multinational companies headquartered in Japan
Manufacturing companies based in Tokyo
Service companies based in Tokyo
Electronics companies established in 1962
1962 establishments in Japan